BrassMunk was a Canadian hip hop group from Scarborough, Ontario. It was formed in 1997 by emcees S-Roc (Dwayne King), Clip (Jason Balde), May One 9 (Randy Brookes) and DJ/producer Agile (Ajene Griffith). May 19 was replaced by King Reign (Kai Thomas) in 2006.

Brassmunk independently released their first EP (variations on the singles "One, 2" and "Stop, Look, Listen") in 1999. Their title track from their second EP, Live Ordeal!, received a Juno nomination for Rap Recording of the Year. The track "El Dorado', from their 2002 EP, also received a Juno nomination for Rap Recording of the Year. 

Also in 2002, they released the EP Dark Sunrise. The following year, Dark Sunrise was re-released worldwide on Battleaxe Records as an LP, and included their previous independent releases. Dark Sunrise was nominated for Rap Recording of the Year at the Juno Awards of 2004. Their follow-up album, FEWturistic, was released on March 20, 2007, and featured several additional artists including Kardinal Offishall and Moka Only. In 2008, the album earned them another Juno nomination.

The band's best known singles are "Big", produced by Mr. Attic of Da Grassroots and "Oh Supaman", produced by Agile.

BrassMunk has been inactive since 2008. Reign died of a heart attack in 2016, at age 40.

Discography

Albums
 Dark Sunrise (2003), Battle Axe Records, Fifty Fourth Music
 FEWturistic (2007), EMI Music Canada, Fifty Fourth Music

EPs
One, 2 / Stop, Look, Listen (1999), Independent
Live Ordeal! (2000), Audio Research Records
Push Up / Get Right (Bring It) (2001), Heavy Headz Entertainment
Dark Sunrise (2002), Virgin Music Canada, 54th Regiment Records
El Dorado / Big (2002), 54th Regiment Records

Singles
"Spider Rider's Theme Song" (2007)

Award nominations
Juno Awards of 2001
Best Rap Recording - "Live Ordeal!" (Nominated)
Juno Awards of 2003
Best Rap Recording - "El Dorado" (Nominated)
Juno Awards of 2004
Rap Recording of the Year - Dark Sunrise (Nominated)
Juno Awards of 2008
Rap Recording of the Year - FEWturistic (Nominated)

References

External links
 BrassMunk at MySpace
 BrassMunk at Discogs

Canadian hip hop groups
Musical groups established in 1997
Musical groups from Toronto
Scarborough, Toronto
Musical quartets
1997 establishments in Ontario